Argysh (Arğış) is a rural locality (a village) in Cherlakovsky Selsoviet, Dyurtyulinsky District, Bashkortostan, Russia. The population was 112 as of 2010. There are 2 streets.

Geography 
Argysh is located 61 km north of Dyurtyuli (the district's administrative centre) by road. Novoshilikovo is the nearest rural locality.

References 

Rural localities in Dyurtyulinsky District